The 1994–95 North West Counties Football League season was the 13th in the history of the North West Counties Football League, a football competition in England. Teams were divided into two divisions: Division One and Division Two.

Division One 

Division One featured two new teams, promoted from Division Two:

 Holker Old Boys 
 Trafford

League table

Division Two 

Division Two featured two new teams:

 Flixton, relegated from Division One
 Tetley Walker, promoted from the Warrington Soccer Leagues

League table

References

External links 
 NWCFL Official Site

North West Counties Football League seasons
8